Rohit Bhardwaj (born 30 January 1983)  is an Indian television actor and model. He is best known for his role as Yudhishthira in the mythological TV show, Mahabharat (2013-2014).

After the show in 2014, he, along with the fellow cast members of Mahabharat, performed on "Mahabharat Show: Fan Meeting Tour" .

He is also famous by the name Om Rohit Mulyono among his Indonesian Fans.

Filmography 
Short Film
 Waapasi (2013) as Hardeep 
 Mumbai as Protagonist  
 Mombatti as Creative Producer

Television
 Ranbir Rano (2008 - 2009) as Sukhi 
 Baat Hamari Pakki Hai (2010 - 2011) as Avi on Sony
 Na Bole Tum Na Maine Kuch Kaha (2012) as  Amar Vedkant on Colors
 Navya..Naye Dhadkan Naye Sawaal (2011-2012) as Mohan Bajpai on Star Plus
 Mahabharat  (2013-2014) as  Yudhishthira on Star Plus
 The New Eat Bulaga Indonesia (2014-2015) as the Judge and Anchor on ANTV
 Bolly star Vaganza (2015) as the performer and judge on ANTV

 Laal Ishq (2018 TV series)
 Laal ishq (Episode 127) as Ranvijay (2019)
 Myopia ( 2020 Web series ) as Omkaar

Awards and nominations 
 2014: Indian Telly Award for Best Actor in a Supporting Role: Mahabharat, Nominated

Personal life
He married his childhood friend, Poonam Bhardwaj in 2006 and couple had a daughter named, Parthivi Bharadwaj, born in 2011. Bharadwaj announced divorce from his wife in 2022 citing that they are divorcing due to compatibility issues and difference in opinions he further added that after he returned from Indonesia he tried to make his marriage work but eventually differences grew between him and his wife.

References

External links
 

Living people
Indian male television actors
Indian male models
1983 births